Noyo can refer to:

Noyo Harbor, Fort Bragg, California
Noyo River, California
Noyo, California, in Mendocino County
SS Noyo, a  number of steamships with this name
Noyo (genus), a genus within the Helminthoglyptidae family of land snails